Flagstaff County is a municipal district in east central Alberta, Canada.

It is located in Census Division 7. The county was incorporated in the current boundaries in 1944 as Municipal District of Killam No. 390, name changed a year later to Municipal District of Flagstaff No. 62. It was established as a county in 1968. Its municipal office is located in the Town of Sedgewick.

Geography

Communities and localities 
 
The following urban municipalities are surrounded by Flagstaff County.
Cities
none
Towns
Daysland
Hardisty
Killam
Sedgewick
Villages
Alliance
Forestburg
Heisler
Lougheed
Summer villages
none

The following hamlets are located within Flagstaff County.
Hamlets
Galahad
Strome

The following localities are located within Flagstaff County.
Localities 
Battle Bend
Bellshill
Berkinshaw
Bonlea
Lorraine
Woodglen

Demographics 

In the 2016 Census of Population conducted by Statistics Canada, Flagstaff County had a population of 3,738 living in 1,380 of its 1,532 total private dwellings, a  change from its 2011 population of 3,591.

Infrastructure 
Transportation
The area is served by Killam-Sedgewick/Flagstaff Regional Airport.

See also 
List of communities in Alberta
List of municipal districts in Alberta

References

External links 

 
Municipal districts in Alberta